Elite Squad: The Enemy Within (also known as Elite Squad 2) is a 2010 Brazilian action thriller film directed and co-produced by José Padilha, who co-wrote it with Bráulio Mantovani and . The sequel to 2007's Elite Squad, it furthers the plot of a semi-fictional account of BOPE, the special operations force of the Rio de Janeiro Military Police, with a focus on the relationship between law enforcement and politics. The film was released in Brazil on October 8, 2010.

Like its predecessor, the film was met with critical acclaim and became the largest box office ticket seller and highest-grossing film of all time in Brazil, ahead of Dona Flor and Her Two Husbands and Avatar, respectively. It was selected as the Brazilian entry for the Best Foreign Language Film at the 84th Academy Awards, but did not make the final shortlist.

Plot
Thirteen years after the events of the first film, former BOPE Captain (now Colonel) Nascimento is ambushed while leaving a hospital. While his car is sprayed with bullets, his voiceover narrates the events leading to that point.

Four years prior, Nascimento arrives at Bangu Penitentiary Complex to quell a riot started by gangleader Beirada, who demands Diogo Fraga, a teacher and human rights activist, to negotiate his conditions. Fraga is escorted to the place and convinces Beirada to release the hostages, but Nascimento's protégé, Captain André Matias, shoots Beirada against Nascimento's orders, which results in multiple inmate deaths.

Nascimento learns that PMERJ commander Formoso plans to dismiss him due to the bad publicity and confronts him in a restaurant, only to be cheered by other diners for his tough line. Rio de Janeiro's State Secretary for Public Safety Guaracy seizes the opportunity and promotes Nascimento, but transfers Matias to the ordinary police as a scapegoat. Nascimento promises Matias his help, but Matias informs journalist Clara Vidal of governmental corruption and lack of support for BOPE, leading to a jail term. Fraga, now married to Nascimento's ex-wife Rosane, is elected to Rio's State Assembly.

Nascimento expands BOPE's arsenal, personnel, armored vehicles and helicopters, enabling them to eliminate entire drug cartels from favelas, hoping this will reduce police corruption. However, dirty cops led by Major Rocha form a militia, which eliminates trafficking while extorting money from businesses and building a political machine.

Four years later, disguised militiamen steal rifles from a police station in Tanque, one of the last drug strongholds, giving their corrupt allies a pretext to demand the authorities expel the heavily armed dealers, allowing the militia to take over. Nascimento listens to phonetaps of dealers and assures Guaracy they are uninvolved; however, corrupt Lieutenant-Colonel Fabio Barbosa claims an informant has implicated them and the raid is authorized. Matias, returned to BOPE by Rocha, occupies the station and ambushes the fleeing dealers, torturing captured drugleader Pepa to learn where the stolen weapons are. As Rocha arrives and inexplicably shoots Pepa, Matias confronts him, but is shot and killed by Rocha's men.

Devastated by Matias' death, Nascimento, aware Fraga has been investigating the militia, taps his phone. Vidal, also investigating, enters one of Rocha's favelas and finds the Governor's re-election material. She phones Fraga but is caught by Rocha's group, who kill her and her photographer. Nascimento listens to the call, realizes Fraga is now a target, takes the recording and goes after him; as he waits outside Fraga's building, Fraga, Rafael and Rosane arrive and are attacked in a drive-by shooting. Nascimento shoots the assailant, but Rafael is wounded. They take him to the hospital and Nascimento hands the recording to Fraga, whereupon he detains and assaults Guaracy, threatening to kill everyone involved if his son dies.

The Assembly opens an investigation into the journalists' disappearances based on the recording delivered by Fraga. However, Nascimento is accused of tapping Fraga's phone to spy on Rosane, forcing his resignation. Believing his militia will be scapegoats, Rocha attempts to ambush him after a visit to Rafael; however, Nascimento, expecting an attack, is aided by BOPE officers. They shoot some of the assailants, but Rocha escapes.

Nascimento is called to testify and implicates the Governor, Guaracy and many other individuals such as Gregorio Fortunato, a legislator and TV host who supported the militia, as many corrupt officers and associates are murdered to prevent them from testifying. The Governor, however, is re-elected and Guaracy becomes representative for Rio. The final scene shows Nascimento reflecting over the political scenario in Brazil and stating that "as long as the conditions for the system remain, it will remain". He visits Rafael as he slowly wakes from his coma.

Cast
 Wagner Moura as Roberto Nascimento, lieutenant colonel of the PMERJ and State Subsecretary for Public Safety.
 Irandhir Santos as Diogo Fraga, a history teacher who becomes a state representative after the Bangu I controversy. Rosane's new husband, he is a left-wing politician who runs for state representative in the Federal Chamber of Deputies. Fraga's role was inspired by real life politician Marcelo Freixo.
 André Ramiro as Captain André Matias, a BOPE officer.
 Maria Ribeiro as Rosane Fraga, ex-wife of Nascimento current wife of Fraga.
 Pedro Van-Hel as Rafael "Rafa" Nascimento, the teenage son of Nascimento and Rosane.
 Sandro Rocha (article on Portuguese Wikipedia) as Captain/Major Rocha, one of the main antagonists of the film. Rocha had a small role in the first film, being one of the sargeants under Fabio's control.
 Milhem Cortaz portrays Lieutenant Colonel/Colonel Fabio Barbosa.
 Tainá Müller plays Clara, a journalist. In the film, Matias reads her interview on the scrapping of the BOPE, after being expelled from the same battalion because of the events in the rebellion in Bangu I and then assists the Deputy Diogo Fraga in investigating of the militias.
 André Mattos as Fortunato, state representative and host of a tabloid TV show.
 Seu Jorge as Beirada, a convict responsible for the Bangu I uprising.

Production

Casting and characters
The first member to be acknowledged was Wagner Moura, who returns with his character Roberto Nascimento, now promoted from captain to lieutenant colonel. In Elite Squad: The Enemy Within, Nascimento is 40 years old and has a slightly grayer hair. André Ramiro is also back as Captain André Matias (promoted from Officer Cadet); the actor was prepped by professionals from the CATI-SWAT to give orders to the cops on-screen. Musician and actor Seu Jorge (who played Mané Galinha in City of God) was invited by director José Padilha to act as one of the antagonists, Beirada; Maria Ribeiro is also back as Roseane, who is no longer married to Nascimento, but to a left wing Congressman. Tainá Müller, who was not in the first film, plays Clara, representing the media. Sandro Rocha, who had little on-screen time during the first film, has a bigger role now, playing Major Rocha, known as Russo (Russian), boss of the militia.

Cast preparation 
Between November and December 2009, before recording for the film started, every actor - except Maria Ribeiro, pregnant at the time - had a training routine, led by Fátima Toledo. Part of the cast also went through a boot camp in Rio, coordinated by Paulo Storani, security adviser, and with the participation of members from BOPE and CATI. André Ramiro said, "They treated us like real cops. No 'I'm-too-important'. I also had to say 'No, sir. Yes, sir'". Wagner Moura had Jiu-Jitsu lessons from fighter Rickson Gracie. The training helped bring a degree of reality to the film; actors had to learn the proper techniques to handle weapons and also action strategies in risk-zones, besides a strong fitness program, laid heavy on those who weren't in the first movie.

Filming and post-production
Filming started on January 25 of 2010, with the participation of eighty real cops as extras. On February 1, recording took place at Morro Dona Marta, in the Botafogo borough, with the use of two helicopters and heavy guns, leading to next-door neighbors thinking it was a real shoot-out. For the scenes happening at the Bangu 1 prison, forty professionals worked during two months constructing a 500m² detention center, based on notations from art director Tiago Marques about the place, since they didn't get clearance to take pictures of the real building. The scenes at the prison were recorded during the four days of the 2010 carnival. One of the film scenes would be shot at the House of Congress in Brasília, but production couldn't get permission. A fake Ethics Committee was built inside the Federation of Industries of Rio de Janeiro, recording took place at April 15. Filming was done in the same month and the film went to post-production.

Release

Strategy against leaks 
After the first film leaked and got in the hands of millions of people before the official release date, the Elite Squad 2 crew created a strategy to avoid the same thing happening to the prequel. Before production began, Marcos Prado informed that, "This time we will have a special security scheme. We will have a security team watching over the editing, transporting the reels, and paying close attention to every little detail. The raw material will be preserved". Director José Padilha concluded, "We won't outsource any of the steps. We are doing the whole post-production at our company, inside our ''". The script was sent to the National Agency of Cinema under the title "Organized crime" and was printed with red ink, to avoid photocopying. The production unit rented an apartment, monitored by cameras, where editing took place. Four people had access to the place, only through passwords, and no means of accessing the Internet. Another strategy used was the marking of each copy sent to the theaters; that way if any of the copies was illegally recorded, they would know where it came from. Military policemen from São Paulo also helped in avoiding the leak. The final picture, still with no sound, was put in a safe.

Domestic release 
Elite Squad: The Enemy Within broke national opening weekend records in Brazil, with more than 1.25 million spectators during its first weekend. This opening was the 5th biggest in Brazilian history and the biggest one for a Brazilian film, so far. A total of 696 theaters screened the film, some as often as eight times per day. In three weeks, the film surpassed the mark of R$ 60 million in gross revenue and over six million viewers  becoming the most successful Brazilian film of the 21st century so far on local theaters. In just nine weeks, the film surpassed 10 million viewers on theaters throughout the country becoming the highest box office of a local film in Brazilian history.

United Kingdom release 
Elite Squad: The Enemy Within was released in the UK by Revolver Entertainment  on August 12, 2011.

United States release 
The film held its United States premiere in January 2011 at the Sundance Film Festival. Since, it has screened at several festivals, including Austin's Fantastic Fest. The film was released in New York City on November 11, 2011, and in Los Angeles on November 18, 2011.

Reception 
The review-aggregation website Rotten Tomatoes gives the film a 93% approval rating based on reviews from 43 critics, and a weighted average of 7.1 out of 10. The website's critical consensus states, "Elite Squad: The Enemy Within is a bleak, violent descent into the Brazilian underbelly, ripping into the favelas with unstoppable and kinetic force." At Metacritic, the film received an average score of 71% based on 18 reviews, indicating "generally favorable reviews".

Possible sequel 
At a press conference after the exhibition "Elite Squad: The Enemy Within" at the Berlin Festival José Padilla was asked about the possible consistency. He ruled out the possibility of launching an "Elite Squad 3". "I told you everything I wanted to say about violence," the director said. Wagner Moura raised the possibility that the third film would be made without the character he interpreted. "Captain Nascimento has nowhere to go from the point of view of dramaturgy, for the big money that it can produce," he said in an interview with GQ magazine in September.

See also
 List of submissions to the 84th Academy Awards for Best Foreign Language Film
 List of Brazilian submissions for the Academy Award for Best Foreign Language Film

References

External links
  
  
 
 
 
 
 

2010 films
2010 action thriller films
2010 crime drama films
Brazilian action thriller films
Brazilian crime drama films
Films about the illegal drug trade
Films directed by José Padilha
Films set in Rio de Janeiro (city)
Films shot in Rio de Janeiro (city)
2010s Portuguese-language films
Variance Films films
Works about organized crime in Brazil